The 2021 Croatia Open  (also known as the Plava Laguna Croatia Open Umag for sponsorship reasons) is a men's tennis tournament played on outdoor clay courts. It is the 31st edition of the Croatia Open, and part of the 250 Series of the 2021 ATP Tour. It take place at the International Tennis Center in Umag, Croatia, from 19 through 25 July 2021.

Finals

Singles 

  Carlos Alcaraz def.  Richard Gasquet, 6–2, 6–2

Doubles 

  Fernando Romboli /  David Vega Hernández def.  Tomislav Brkić /  Nikola Ćaćić, 6–3, 7–5

Points and prize money

Point distribution

Prize money 

*per team

Singles main draw entrants

Seeds 

 1 Rankings are as of 12 July 2021.

Other entrants
The following players received wildcards into the main draw:
  Duje Ajduković
  Holger Rune
  Nino Serdarušić

The following players received entry from the qualifying draw:
  Daniel Altmaier
  Andrea Collarini
  Alessandro Giannessi
  Filip Horanský

The following player received entry as a lucky loser:
  Renzo Olivo

Withdrawals
Before the tournament
  Salvatore Caruso → replaced by  Renzo Olivo
  Taro Daniel → replaced by  Andrej Martin
  Lorenzo Musetti → replaced by  Carlos Taberner

Doubles main draw entrants

Seeds

1 Rankings are as of 12 July 2021.

Other entrants
The following pairs received wildcards into the doubles main draw:
  Duje Ajduković /  Frane Ninčević
  Admir Kalender /  Mili Poljičak

Withdrawals
Before the tournament
  Simone Bolelli /  Máximo González → replaced by  Damir Džumhur /  Antonio Šančić

References

External links 
 Official website

Croatia Open Umag
2021
2021 in Croatian tennis
Croatia Open Umag